NGC 5890 is an unbarred lenticular galaxy in the constellation Libra. It was discovered in April 1785 by Ormond Stone.

See also 
 Unbarred lenticular galaxy 
 List of NGC objects (5001–6000)
 Libra (constellation)

References

External links 
 
 SEDS
 SIMBAD
 NED

Libra (constellation)
Unbarred lenticular galaxies
5890
Discoveries by Ormond Stone